The following is a list of the 66 municipalities (comuni) of the Province of Mantua, Lombardy, Italy.

List

See also
List of municipalities of Italy

References

Mantua